Violets Are Blue is the seventh novel by James Patterson to feature the Washington, D.C. homicide detective and forensic psychiatrist Alex Cross.

Plot summary
Alex receives a call from the Mastermind, who tells Alex that he killed Cavalierre.

Kyle Craig calls Alex about a similarity between two murders in San Francisco and a murder in Washington DC that they’d worked on a few months before. The case involved a runaway girl that was found hanged from a light fixture in a hotel room.

The FBI requests that he go to San Francisco to meet Inspector Jamilla Hughes.  First, Alex takes Jannie and Ali to school but tells them he'll be back for Damon's choir concert.

Jamilla picks Cross up at the airport. She takes him to the morgue to see the bodies. A friend of hers, Dr. Allan Pang (a dental expert)is examining the bites on the victims. After reviewing the bites, he deduces that the man was bitten and mauled by a tiger and the girl was bitten by humans.

William and Michael watch the story unfold on TV. They were on a mission and the publicity was part of the plan. William tells Michael that he has a plan for that night. The two brothers break into a funeral home and feast on a dead woman who had not yet been embalmed.
Cross is still impressed by Jamilla's work ethic. Alex is working on trying to find a lead on the tiger. He's checking with zoos, veterinarians, and animal trainers.
Jamilla calls Alex early the next morning regarding a lead from a reporter friend. They drive to Los Angeles to meet with a woman who had gotten away after an attack by two men, but she had been bitten several times. The attacks had happened over a year ago.  
Jamilla returns to San Francisco, but leaves her notes with Alex and Kyle. She believes that although the murders are similar, the patterns are different, and may have been committed by different people. Alex concurs. Jamilla tells Alex about the break-in at the funeral home. 
Then, he thinks about Kyle's next victim, and he decides it could be his old friend, Kate McTiernan from Kiss The Girls. After calling Kate and warning her to get out of town for her own safety, Alex rushes to her home.
Kyle is sent to prison, Alex officially starts dating Jamilla Hughes, and things start to calm down for the first time in years for the Cross family.

Notes
 Kyle Craig knew both Casanova and The Gentleman Caller from his days at Duke University and hunted and killed with them. Kyle also killed on his own in Virginia and Pennsylvania.
 Kyle was an atheist because he believed he was second to no-one.
 Kyle was the Mastermind because he knew everything about Cross because he worked with him.

2001 American novels
Alex Cross (novel series)
Novels set in San Francisco
Little, Brown and Company books